Ryan Kurnia (born 28 June 1996) is an Indonesian professional footballer who plays as a winger for Liga 1 club Persikabo 1973.

Club career

TIRA-Persikabo
Ryan was signed for TIRA-Persikabo to play in Liga 1 in the 2019 season. He made his league debut on 18 May 2019 as a substitute in a match against Badak Lampung at the Pakansari Stadium, Cibinong.

Sulut United
He was signed for Sulut United to play in Liga 2 in the 2020 season. This season was suspended on 27 March 2020 due to the COVID-19 pandemic. The season was abandoned and was declared void on 20 January 2021.

Arema
Ryan was signed for Arema to play in Liga 1 in the 2021–22 season. He made his league debut on 13 January 2022 as a substitute in a win 2–0 match against PSS Sleman at Kapten I Wayan Dipta Stadium.

Persikabo 1973
In May 2022, Liga 1 club Persikabo 1973 announced that Kurnia would be join the club for 2022–23 season. He made his league debut on 31 July 2022 in a match against Dewa United at the Indomilk Arena, Tangerang. On 3 September 2022, Kurnia made his first goal for the club in Liga 1, earning them a 3–2 win over Borneo Samarinda. He played the full 90 minutes in a 2–0 win against PSS Sleman on 15 September. On 9 December 2022, Kurnia give one assists to Bruno Dybal in Persikabo's 1–1 draw over RANS Nusantara. He scored his league goal for the club, opening the scoring in a 1–1 draw against PS Barito Putera on 17 December.

References

External links 
Ryan Kurnia at Soccerway
Ryan Kurnia at Liga Indonesia

1996 births
Living people
Indonesian footballers
People from Bogor
Sportspeople from West Java
Persikabo Bogor players
Dewa United F.C. players
Persita Tangerang players
PS TIRA players
Arema F.C. players
Persikabo 1973 players
Liga 2 (Indonesia) players
Liga 1 (Indonesia) players
Association football midfielders